Ngawi Regency is a regency (kabupaten) of East Java, Indonesia. Ngawi is well known around the world for its Pithecantropus erectus that was found by Eugene Dubois, a Dutchman. Ngawi is located in East Java Province, but adjoins Central Java province. Its capital Ngawi (city). Ngawi is also the main gate to enter East Java province since there are intersections that connect Surabaya–Bojonegoro–Ngawi (city)–Solo–Jogja–Bandung–Jakarta.

Ngawi (city), has the largest central park ("alun-alun") in Indonesia. This large area includes a West Park and an East Park, separated by Merdeka Street. The West Park consists of a football court, a volleyball court, and a ceremonial podium near the main mosque.

The East Park consists of a playground area, two tennis courts, a basketball hall, a parking area, a futsal court, a skating place, and a culinary area said to be "the most favorite place visited by Ngawinese". The municipal hall (called Alun-Alun Merdeka) is located in the central part of Ngawi town.

Van Den Bosch Fortress is a central historic site of the Ngawi Regency. It is located at the confluence of the two biggest rivers in East Java: the Solo and the Madiun.

Climate

Ngawi has a monsoon tropical climate (Köppen climate classification Am), dry at mid-year, with  heavy rain the rest of the year.

Administrative districts
Ngawi Regency is divided into nineteen districts (kecamatan), tabulated below with their areas and their population totals from the 2010 census and the 2020 census. The table also includes the location of the district headquarters and the number of administrative villages (rural desa and urban kelurahan) in each district.

Trinil Site

Trinil Museum
Trinil Museum is about 15 kilometres from Ngawi city and near to the Bengawan Solo River. The museum contains a collection of about 1,500 fossils, some of which are a million years old. As of 2013 up to 500 fossils had yet to be identified. In the late 19th century Eugene Dubois found Pithecantropus eretus in the Trinil area.

Oldest human-made mark in the world
Researchers found in Trinil site that scratch at Pseudodon vondembuschianus trinilensis plain water clam shell aged 500,000 years is the oldest scratch in the world. Although the scratch is perhaps not art, its zig-zag shape is evidence that the scratch is human made. The clam shell has been found in 1896, but the zig-zag scratch was found in 2014.

References

External links

 Official site

Ngawi Regency
Regencies of Indonesia